The Motorsport UK Scottish Rally Championship is a rallying series run throughout Scotland over the course of a year that comprises both gravel and tarmac surface rallies. The 2023 series will commence on the forest tracks around Inverness on 4 March with the season finale due to take place in Kielder Forest, Northumberland on 21 October. The championship will be sponsored by KNC Groundworks for the fifth year in succession.

2023 calendar
For season 2023 there will be eight events held on both gravel and tarmac surfaces.

2023 events podium

Drivers Points Classification

Points are awarded to the highest placed registered driver on each event as follows: 30, 28, 27, 26, and so on down to 1 point. 
At the end of the Championship, competitors will count their best 6 scores out of the 8 events as his/her final overall Championship score.

References

External links
 
 RSAC Scottish Rally Homepage

Scottish Rally Championship seasons
Scottish Rally Championship
Rally Championship
Scottish Rally Championship
Scottish Rally Championship